Darkesh is a village in Almeh Rural District, Samalqan District, Maneh and Samalqan County, North Khorasan Province, Iran. At the 2006 census, its population was 872, in 218 families.

See also

References 

Populated places in Maneh and Samalqan County